= Han Hsu Tung =

Taiwanese sculptor

Han Hsu Tung (Chinese: 韓旭東; pinyin: Hán Xùdōng) is a Taiwanese sculptor. He is known for three dimensional sculptures that morphs away into pixels.

== Education ==
Han graduated with a degree of BS in anthropology from the National Taiwan University in 1985.

== Career ==
After graduating with a degree in anthropology, he worked at a daytime job and pursued wood carving at night. He spent three and a half years studying wood carving. His first exhibition in 1991 in Taipei was a success and became a stepping stone to pursue the field. He began making wooden sculptures that are pixelated in 2010. His early works depicted people such as national legends from the Qing dynasty. Since then, He has exhibited in major cities around the world, such as Japan, New York, Australia, Vancouver, Taipei, Seoul, Los Angeles, Spain, Paris, Japan, New York, Australia and Vancouver.

== Art ==
Han creates dynamic, vivid and complex wooden structures that dissipate away into a monochromatic array of pixels. It is usually made of walnut, teak, African woodwork, soft western redcedar and/or Laotian fir. It often depicts men, women and animals. He came up with it after being inspired by digital technology, after noticing that the computer screen is made up of pixels. Each wooden structure takes 3–4 months to complete and undergoes several meticulous revisions.
